Charles McCullough, sometimes known as Charlie McCullough, (18 December 1923 – 4 October 2014) was a unionist politician in Northern Ireland. He was born in Belfast.

McCullough was based on the Shankill Road.  He was a member of the founding executive of Ulster Protestant Action, in 1956.  He was elected to Belfast City Council for the group in 1958, topping the poll.  He left the group before the next elections, in 1961, joining the Ulster Unionist Party (UUP).

Cullough secured re-election under his new party colours and, by 1965, he was the chair of its Improvement Committee.  He resigned from this following a dispute over the naming of the Queen Elizabeth Bridge; he had instead hoped it would be named for Edward Carson, and believed that this name had been rejected due to party indiscipline.

In 1968, McCullough was elected to the Senate of Northern Ireland.  He resigned from the UUP in September 1970, and became a founder member of the Democratic Unionist Party (DUP) the following year.   The Senate ceased to meet in 1972, and, although McCullough remained a supporter of the DUP, he did not stand in any further elections. On 4 October 2014, he died at the age of 90.

References

1923 births
2014 deaths
Democratic Unionist Party members of the Senate of Northern Ireland
Members of Belfast City Council
Members of the Senate of Northern Ireland 1965–1969
Members of the Senate of Northern Ireland 1969–1973
Ulster Protestant Action members
Ulster Unionist Party members of the Senate of Northern Ireland